Mansour bin Muqrin Al Saud (1974 – 5 November 2017)  was a Saudi businessman, member of the House of Saud, and advisor at the Court of the Crown Prince of Saudi Arabia. In April 2015, he was appointed advisor to the Custodian of the Two Holy Mosques with the rank of minister. He was the son of Prince Muqrin, former Crown Prince of Saudi Arabia. He was killed in mysterious circumstances when his helicopter crashed on 5 November 2017, hours after a major purge of the kingdom's political and business leadership.

Family
Mansour was the second youngest son of Prince Muqrin and Abta bint Hamoud Al Rashid, and a full brother of  Turki bin Muqrin and Fahd bin Muqrin. In 2013, Mansour married a daughter of his first cousin Prince Saud bin Fahd Al Saud.

Career
In 2013 Mansour bin Muqrin was named deputy governor of 'Asir Region which he held until his death in 2017. In January 2015, King Salman accepted Crown Prince Muqrin's recommendation that Mansour be made advisor at the Court of the Crown Prince. He was a partner in Ethan Allen's Saudi franchise. Mansour was vice chairman of Al Bayan Foundation, which builds colleges of higher education in Saudi Arabia.

Death
Mansour bin Muqrin died in a helicopter crash near Abha, near the border with Yemen. The prince died along with seven other officials while returning from an inspection tour according to the Interior Ministry. It did not give a cause for the crash. His helicopter went down and disappeared from radar on 5 November 2017. His brother Faisal in a statement to Saudi newspaper Okaz denied reports that Mansour's death was suspicious. In October 2018, Middle East Eye claimed that Mansour was killed by the Tiger Squad, and that he had fled the 2017 Saudi Arabian purge which began on 4 November 2017.

References

20th-century Saudi Arabian businesspeople
21st-century Saudi Arabian businesspeople
21st-century Saudi Arabian politicians
1974 births
2017 deaths
Mansour
People from 'Asir Province
Victims of aviation accidents or incidents in Saudi Arabia